The Middle Tennessee Blue Raiders men's basketball team is the basketball team that represents Middle Tennessee State University in Murfreesboro, Tennessee, United States.  The school's team currently competes in Conference USA and are currently led by fifth-year head coach Nick McDevitt.

Postseason results

NCAA tournament results
The Blue Raiders have appeared in the NCAA tournament nine times. Their combined record is 4–9. The 2015–16 season was most notable after MTSU became just the eighth #15 seed to win a game, winning against Michigan State.

NAIA Tournament results
The Blue Raiders have appeared in the NAIA Tournament one time. Their record is 0–1.

NIT results
The Blue Raiders have appeared in the National Invitation Tournament (NIT) four times. Their combined record is 5–4.

CBI results
The Blue Raiders have appeared in the College Basketball Invitational (CBI) one time. Their combined record is 3–1.

CIT results
The Blue Raiders have appeared in the CollegeInsider.com Postseason Tournament (CIT) two times. Their combined record is 0–2.

Notable players

Shawn Jones (born 1992), basketball player for Hapoel Haifa of the Israeli Basketball Premier League
 Reggie Upshaw (born 1995), basketball player in the Israel Basketball Premier League

References

External links